Clyde Eugene Flowers (October 6, 1921 – August 15, 2000) was an American football player. He attended Texas Christian University where he played at the guard position for the TCU Horned Frogs football team. He was selected by the Newspaper Enterprise Association (NEA) as a first-team player on the 1944 College Football All-America Team.  He was inducted into the TCU Hall of Fame in 1977 and died in 2000 at age 78 in Houston, Texas.

References 

1921 births
2000 deaths
American football guards
TCU Horned Frogs football players
Players of American football from Texas
People from Perryton, Texas